Edmond Sandoz (8 July 1872 – 20 April 1943) was a French sports shooter. He competed in two events at the 1912 Summer Olympics.

References

1872 births
1943 deaths
French male sport shooters
Olympic shooters of France
Shooters at the 1912 Summer Olympics
Sportspeople from Besançon